George Hurdalek (6 February 1908 – 15 June 1980) was a German screenwriter. He wrote for more than 40 films between 1934 and 1975. He was born in Görlitz, Germany, and died in Munich, Germany.

Selected filmography

 The Valiant Navigator (1935)
 The King's Prisoner (1935)
 Women for Golden Hill (1938)
 Five Million Look for an Heir (1938)
 Front Theatre (1942)
 The Time with You (1948, director)
 The Sergeant's Daughter (1952, director)
 His Royal Highness (1953)
 Ludwig II (1955)
 The Last Man (1955)
 Without You All Is Darkness (1956)
 Queen Louise (1957)
 Goodbye, Franziska (1957)
 Iron Gustav (1958, director)
 Sweetheart of the Gods (1960)
 Our House in Cameroon (1961)
 The Indian Scarf (1963)
 Jailbreak in Hamburg (1971)
 My Father, the Ape and I (1971)
 Crime After School (1975)

References

External links
 

1908 births
1980 deaths
German male screenwriters
People from Görlitz
German male writers
Film people from Saxony
20th-century German screenwriters